Mesalina brevirostris, also known as Blanford's short-nosed desert lizard, is a species of sand-dwelling lizard in the family Lacertidae. It occurs in Saudi Arabia, Qatar, Iran, and United Arab Emirates.

References

brevirostris
Reptiles described in 1874
Taxa named by William Thomas Blanford